A Persian well is a type of water well found in the Middle East, often used in conjunction with a qanat.  These wells feature an ox-driven pump where the ox walks in circles around a central drive shaft which turns a wheel that raises water via a chain of buckets from the qanat or a well.  In some cases, water flows fast enough that a subterranean waterwheel may harness enough power to raise the buckets of water to the surface level.

Appearances in Ancient Literature 

As per Ranjit Sitaram Pandit's translation of Rajatanangini by Kalhana, this mechanism is referred to by Kalhana when alludes to a Yantra to take water from a well. In Sanskrit literature, it is referred to as Araghatta and as per Ranjit Sitaram Pandit, the name Persian Wheel is a modern misnomer.

Further reading 

 Habib, Irfan. "Pursuing the History of Indian Technology." Social Scientist 20 (1992): 1-22. JSTOR. (see pages 8, 9 and 10)

References 

Water wells
Animal equipment